The 2021 FINA World Junior Diving Championships took place in Kyiv, Ukraine, from 2 to 9 December 2021.

Medal summary

Men's events

Women's events

Synchronized diving

Medal table

Participating nations
Divers from 23 countries participated at the championships.

References

External links 

FINA World Junior Diving Championships
FINA World Junior Diving Championships
International sports competitions hosted by Ukraine
Sports competitions in Kyiv
FINA World Junior Diving Championships